Chaumont-Gistoux is a municipality of Wallonia located in the Belgian province of Walloon Brabant. On 1 January 2006 Chaumont-Gistoux had a total population of 10,926. The total area is 48.09 km2 which gives a population density of 227 inhabitants per km2.

It was formed from the fusion, in 1977, of Dion-Valmont (itself a fusion in 1971 of Dion-le-Val and Dion-le-Mont), Bonlez, Corroy-le-Grand, Longueville and Chaumont-Gistoux. The administrative offices are now in the village of Gistoux.

It is a semi-rural municipality with several working farms, large areas given over to fields and forests, although there is a major industry of sand extraction, now mostly in decline. Due to this history there are now several haulage and construction firms based in the municipality.

Chaumont-Gistoux is on the KW-line, a defensive line erected early in the Second World War, intended to prevent invasion from Nazi Germany. A small museum houses information about the line and many exhibits from the war.

Princess Claire of Belgium grew up in Chaumont-Gistoux. The Coombs family still resides there to this day, and the Princess, her husband Prince Laurent and their children are often seen in the municipality.

Villages in the municipality
Bonlez, Chaumont, Corroy-le-Grand, Dion-le-Mont, Dion-le-Val, Gistoux, Longueville and Vieusart or (Vieux-Sart).

Notes

References

External links
 

 
Municipalities of Walloon Brabant